Anna Knauer (born 20 February 1995) is a German former professional racing cyclist, who rode professionally between 2014 and 2017 for the  and  teams.

Major results

Track

2011
 National Novices Track Championships 
1st  500m time trial
1st  Individual pursuit
1st  Points race
 1st  Team pursuit, National Junior Track Championships
2012
 UEC European Junior Track Championships
1st  Omnium
2nd  Individual pursuit
 National Junior Track Championships
1st  Points race
1st  Team pursuit
2nd 500m time trial
2013
 1st  Omnium, UCI World Juniors Track Cycling Championships
National Junior Track Championships 
1st  Points race
1st  Team pursuit
1st  Team sprint
1st  Individual pursuit
1st  500m time trial
2014
 National Track Championships
1st  Omnium
2nd Individual pursuit
2nd Points race
 3rd  Omnium, UEC European Track Championships
 3rd Omnium, Sprintermeeting
2015
 National Track Championships
1st  Points race
1st  Omnium
 UEC European Under-23 Track Championships
2nd  Team pursuit (with Lisa Klein, Mieke Kröger and Gudrun Stock)
3rd  Omnium
 2nd Omnium, Grand Prix of Poland
 3rd  Omnium, 2014–15 UCI Track Cycling World Cup, Cali
2016
 1st  Omnium, National Track Championships
2017
 3rd Scratch, Six Days of Bremen

Road

2011
 National Novices Road Championships
1st  Road race
1st  Time trial
2012
 National Junior Road Championships
1st  Road race
3rd Time trial
2013
 National Junior Road Championships
1st  Road race
2nd Time trial
2014
 1st Stage 2 (TTT) Belgium Tour
2015
 3rd EPZ Omloop van Borsele
 8th Ronde van Overijssel

See also
 2014 Rabo-Liv Women Cycling Team season

References

External links
 

1995 births
Living people
German female cyclists
People from Eichstätt
Sportspeople from Upper Bavaria
Olympic cyclists of Germany
Cyclists at the 2016 Summer Olympics
Cyclists from Bavaria
20th-century German women
21st-century German women